Norman Bannerman Holland  (24 March 1924 – 30 November 2014) was a New Zealand jockey. 

Born in Barrow-in-Furness, England, in 1924, Holland emigrated to New Zealand on the Ruahine with his father and brother in 1929, and settled in Taranaki.

After leaving school at the age of 13, Holland was an apprentice jockey with Oney Cox at Hawera, and rode his first race in 1940. He went on to win the New Zealand jockeys' premiership three times—in 1945–46, 1947-48 and 1951-52— and finished second on a further three occasions. He retired from riding in 1974, having ridden over 900 winners.

He continued his involvement with racing, spending 17 years as riding master at the Auckland Apprentice School, and serving as the jockeys' liaison officer for the Auckland Racing Club.

In the 1977 New Year Honours, Holland was appointed an Officer of the Order of the British Empire, for services to horseracing. He was made a life member of the Auckland Racing Club in 2005, and at the 2010 New Zealand Thoroughbred Racing Awards he received the award for contribution to racing.

Holland died in Auckland in 2014. His funeral was held at Ellerslie Racecourse, and he was buried at Purewa Cemetery.

See also

 Thoroughbred racing in New Zealand

References

1924 births
2014 deaths
Sportspeople from Barrow-in-Furness
English emigrants to New Zealand
New Zealand jockeys
New Zealand Officers of the Order of the British Empire
Burials at Purewa Cemetery